The 2013 Comerica Bank Challenger was a professional tennis tournament played on hard courts. It was the 26th edition of the tournament which was part of the 2013 ATP Challenger Tour. It took place in Aptos, California, United States between 5 and 11 August July 2013.

Singles main-draw entrants

Seeds

 1 Rankings are as of July 29, 2013.

Other entrants
The following players received wildcards into the singles main draw:
  Andre Dome
  Mitchell Krueger
  Dennis Novikov
  Tennys Sandgren

The following players got into the singles main draw via Special Exempt:
  Daniel Evans
  Greg Jones

The following players received entry from the qualifying draw:
  Farrukh Dustov
  James McGee
  Denys Molchanov
  John-Patrick Smith

The following players got into the singles main draw via Lucky Loser:
  James Ward

Champions

Singles

  Bradley Klahn def.  Dan Evans 3–6, 7–6(7–5), 6–4

Doubles

  Jonathan Erlich /  Andy Ram def.  Chris Guccione /  Matt Reid 6–3, 6–7(6–8), [10–2]

References
Official Website

External links
ITF Search
ATP official site

Comerica Bank Challenger
Nordic Naturals Challenger
Com